The 2022–23 season is the 96th in the history of FC Dynamo Kyiv and their 32nd consecutive season in the top flight. The club are participating in the Premier League, the UEFA Champions League and the UEFA Europa League.

Players

Squad

Also under contract

Out on loan

Transfers

In

Out

Loans out

Contract suspensions

Released

Pre-season and friendlies

Competitions

Overall record

Premier League

League table

Results summary

Results by round

Matches

UEFA Champions League

Second qualifying round 
The draw for the third qualifying round was held on 15 June 2022.

Third qualifying round 
The draw for the third qualifying round was held on 18 July 2022.

Play-off round 
The draw for the play-off round was held on 2 August 2022.

UEFA Europa League

Group stage 

The draw for the group stage was held on 26 August 2022.

Squad statistics

Appearances and goals

|-
|colspan="14"|Players who suspended their contracts:
|-
|colspan="16"|Players away on loan:

|-
|colspan="16"|Players who left Dynamo Kyiv during the season:

|}

Goalscorers

Clean sheets

Disciplinary record

Notes

References 

FC Dynamo Kyiv seasons
Dynamo Kyiv